The Bishop Tuff is a welded tuff that formed 764,800 ± 600 years ago as a rhyolitic pyroclastic flow during the approximately six day eruption that created the Long Valley Caldera. Large outcrops of the tuff are located in Inyo and Mono Counties, California, United States. Approximately 200 cubic kilometers of ash and tuff erupted outside the caldera.

Modern exposure
The Bishop Tuff caps a volcanic plateau in the northern Owens Valley in eastern California. The tableland formation is located east of U.S. Route 395 and west of the Nevada stateline, sitting northwest of Bishop and southeast of Crowley Lake and Mammoth Lakes. Another part of the flow is south of Mono Lake, and surrounding the Mono-Inyo Craters.

The Owens River cuts through the Volcanic Tableland, an ignimbrite plateau that is a principal sector of the Bishop Tuff outflow sheet. Erosion of the plateau by the Owens River has created the Owens River Gorge.

Lithology 
The Bishop Tuff is a high-silicate rhyolitic welded tuff, made up of ash and pumice clasts. The main minerals found in the pumice clasts are biotite, plagioclase, quartz, and sanidine. The main composition is SiO2 (73.4-77.9%), followed by Al2O3 (12.7%).

The Bishop Tuff is compositionally zoned. The lower section, formed from ash fall, is notated by pyroxene-free high-silica rhyolite pumice. The upper section, formed by pyroclastic flow, is notated by pyroxene-bearing high-silica rhyolite pumice. The magma that formed the Bishop Tuff is suggested to be a "residual magma derived from some parental magma and not itself a primary or parental partial melt of common crustal rocks".

See also
 Glass Mountain

References

External links

 Long Valley Observatory - Bishop Tuff
 BLM Bishop Field Office web page

Tuff formations
Pyroclastic plateaus
Volcanism of California
Geologic formations of California
Geology of Inyo County, California
Landforms of Inyo County, California
Landforms of Mono County, California
Inyo National Forest
VEI-7 eruptions
Pleistocene volcanism
Volcanic eruptions in the United States
Plinian eruptions